Lord Belial is a Swedish black metal band.

History
The band formed in 1992 and released their debut album in 1995; placing them among the pioneers of Swedish black metal. Their sound has been compared with bands such as Dissection. In January 2009, they stopped all their activities, the main reason being the growing hearing problem of their drummer, Micke Backelin.

Despite an announcement in July 2010 that the band was working on new material, about one year later they announced on their official website and on Twitter that "Lord Belial are not active. No album or gigs are planned for the moment. No interviews will be answered." In 2013 the only members remaining are Thomas Backelin and Micke Backelin. Live session musicians are Fredrik Wester on guitars, and Adam Chapman on bass.

Lord Belial returned to touring in 2014 with performances at the Mörkaste Småland Festival. Lord Belial has continued touring and announced their tour schedule for 2020 and 2021. The band signed with Hammerheart Records in May 2021, and released Rapture, their first studio album in 14 years, in May 2022.

Members

Current 
 Thomas Backelin - guitars, vocals
 Micke Backelin - drums
 Niclas "Pepa" Green - guitars

Live 2013 
 Fredrik Wester - guitars
 Adam Chapman - bass

Former, session 
 Anders Backelin - bass
 Daniel "Mojjo" Moilanen - drums
 Fredrik "Plague" Wester - guitars (2000, 2002)
 Hjalmar Nielsen - guitars
 Jenny "Lilith" Andersson - flute (1993–1999 and Kiss the Goat)
 Cecilia Sander - flute (Into the Frozen Shadows and Angelgrinder)
 Catharina Jacobsson - flute (Enter the Moonlight Gate)
 Annelie Jacobsson - flute (Unholy Crusade)
 Jelena Almvide - cello (Enter the Moonlight Gate and Unholy Crusade)

Discography 
 Kiss the Goat (1995)
 Enter the Moonlight Gate (1997)
 Unholy Crusade (1999)
 Angelgrinder (2002)
 Doomed by Death (Split, 2002)
 Purify Sweden (Single, 2003)
 Scythe of Death (EP, 2003)
 The Seal of Belial (2004)
 Nocturnal Beast (2005)
 Revelation (2007)
 The Black Curse (2008)
 Rapture (2022)

Videography 
 Night Divine (VHS, 2001)
 Mark of the Beast (DVD, 2004)

References

External links 
 
 

Swedish black metal musical groups
Musical groups established in 1992
Musical groups disestablished in 2009
Musical groups reestablished in 2010
Musical groups disestablished in 2011
Musical groups reestablished in 2013
Musical groups disestablished in 2015
Musical groups reestablished in 2020